WPPT (channel 35) is a PBS member television station in Philadelphia, Pennsylvania, United States. It is owned by the Lehigh Valley Public Telecommunications Corporation alongside to Allentown-licensed fellow PBS member WLVT-TV (channel 39). As WYBE, the station's transmitter was located in the Roxborough section of Philadelphia; in 2018, it entered into a channel sharing agreement with Allentown-based independent station WFMZ-TV (channel 69) and began operating from WFMZ's transmitter on South Mountain near Allentown.

WYBE's main channel was previously carried in the New York City television market on the 66.4 digital subchannel of West Milford, New Jersey–licensed MHz WorldView affiliate WNYJ-TV.

History

Prior uses of channel 35 in Philadelphia
The UHF channel 35 allocation in Philadelphia was first used by WHYY-TV in 1957. However, it was obvious by then that a UHF station was not nearly enough to serve a market that stretched from the Lehigh Valley to the north to the Jersey Shore in the south. In 1963, WHYY moved its call letters and programming to VHF channel 12, licensed to nearby Wilmington, Delaware. Metropolitan Philadelphia Educational Radio and Television, owner of WHYY, continued to operate channel 35 as WUHY-TV, using it mostly to air instructional programming on weekdays (outside of designated legal and administrative holidays) during the school year. WUHY-TV was the first station in the world to broadcast Sesame Street during a week of test broadcasts in July 1969. A slightly-retooled version of the show made its national premiere on National Educational Television (NET) four months later in November 1969.

By 1975, WHYY had stopped operating the UHF station, and eventually returned its license to the Federal Communications Commission (FCC). In the 1980s, the channel 35 frequency was used by W35AB, a translator relaying Univision programming from New York City's WXTV, while the FCC evaluated applications for a new permanent licensee. The translator ultimately moved to channel 28 and evolved into WFPA-CD, the Philadelphia outlet for Univision sister network UniMás, following Univision's acquisition of full-power station WUVP.

WYBE
WYBE, the new permanent licensee on channel 35, began broadcasting on June 1, 1990, under the ownership of Independence Public Media of Philadelphia, Inc. (also known as Independence Media).

From 1998 to 2004, the organization was led by Sherri Hope Culver, formerly of the New Jersey Network (NJN). During this period, WYBE moved into a new facility; began operating a digital signal, and focused on original productions, such as Culture Trek (a series of three specials, followed U.S. teenagers as they pursued projects with local teens in Costa Rica, Ireland and Jamaica), The Neighbors Project and The Tolerance Project (which addressed race, sexual orientation and religion). The station also featured a nightly talk show, Philly Live, which was later restructured into five different talk shows: Gente (aimed at Hispanic audiences), Shades of Opinion (focusing on issues relevant to African-American community), Asian Outlook, Global Lens and Out Loud (focusing on LGBT issues). Most of WYBE's programs in this period were syndicated shows distributed by American Public Television (APT) and the National Educational Telecommunications Association (NETA); the weeknightly news discussion program Democracy Now! was also part of the program schedule. Several of these programs won national Telly Awards, Emmy nominations and a special screening at the Philadelphia International Gay & Lesbian Film Festival. The WYBE World Heritage Council Initiative supports Philadelphia's diverse ethnic communities, funded by the William Penn Foundation.

Since 2005, WYBE was led by Howard Blumenthal, who also served simultaneously as executive director of the New Jersey Network from 2009 to 2010.

MiND: Media Independence

On May 15, 2008, the station was rebranded as "MiND: Media Independence", which emphasized its schedule on short-form programs, often with a "public media for the public good" perspective. MiND became the first broadcast television station in the U.S. whose program stream was simultaneously available online and on broadcast television worldwide, in a form of an internet simulcast of its broadcast signal, and a library of programs available on-demand. Some WYBE programs are also available on the MHz Worldview network, which is seen on selected television stations and cable systems, as well as on satellite and the internet.

On April 13, 2017, Independence Public Media of Philadelphia, Inc. announced that it gave up its broadcast license as WYBE (Channel 35), and would sign off the air on November 3, 2017. Independence Media, however, would continue to operate as a non-profit corporation.

On October 27, 2017, it was announced that WYBE would continue MiND 35.1, despite previous notices regarding termination of broadcast. Prior to its planned termination date, MiND TV went temporarily off air due to the equipment at the WYBE transmitter site having failed, according to the channel's website, but would be restored on November 1, 2017.

WPPT

On January 5, 2018, WYBE began channel-sharing with WBPH-TV, significantly reducing its over-the-air coverage in the Delaware Valley. MiND ended their short-form viewer-created programming format, transitioning their main channel to an affiliate of MHz Worldview, while 35.2 became an affiliate of World. The WYBE license was transferred to the Lehigh Valley Public Telecommunications Corporation, owner of WLVT-TV, on March 15, 2018; concurrently the call letters were changed to WPPT. After MHz Worldview discontinued operations on March 1, 2020, the station switched to a secondary lineup of PBS programming as "PBS 39 Extra", serving as a brand extension of WLVT.

Programming
WYBE broadcast a wide array of programming, such as those featuring independent filmmakers (such as Through the Lens and Philadelphia Stories); international programming from countries such as India, Japan, France, China, Greece, the United Kingdom, and Germany; programming aimed at the LGBT community (such as Gay USA); and public affairs and current events programming (such as Democracy Now and GRITtv).

WYBE was also first U.S. station to air the Australian drama Water Rats, the Australian children's series The Shapies and the Irish drama Ros na Rún.

Technical information

Subchannels
The station's digital channel is multiplexed:

Analog-to-digital conversion
WYBE shut down its analog signal, over UHF channel 35, on June 12, 2009, the official date in which full-power television stations in the United States transitioned from analog to digital broadcasts under federal mandate. The station's digital signal relocated from its pre-transition UHF channel 34 to channel 35 for post-transition operations.

The station's digital signal formerly operated at only 25% power until March 2010, when WYBE's power was increased fully to their FCC-authorized effective radiated power.

See also
 MiND: Media Independence

References

Television channels and stations established in 1990
PPT
1990 establishments in Pennsylvania
PBS member stations
PPT (TV)